The Piggott Post Office is located at 119 North 3rd Street in central Piggott, Arkansas.  It is a single-story brick building, with a flat roof that has an encircling parapet, and a concrete foundation.  Construction on the building took place mostly in 1937, but was not completed until 1941.  The building is noted for its lobby murals, painted by Iowa native Dan Rhodes, with funding from the United States Treasury Department's Section of Fine Arts, a Depression-era jobs program for artists.  The murals depict air mail postal service.

The building was listed on the National Register of Historic Places in 1998.

See also 

National Register of Historic Places listings in Clay, Arkansas
List of United States post offices

References

External links

Post office buildings on the National Register of Historic Places in Arkansas
Colonial Revival architecture in Arkansas
Government buildings completed in 1937
Buildings and structures in Clay County, Arkansas
National Register of Historic Places in Clay County, Arkansas
Historic district contributing properties in Arkansas